Tuff Darts! is a 1978 album by Tuff Darts and was released on the Sire Records label. Mick Rock was responsible for the sleeve design and photography.

Track listing
 "Rats" (Butani, Salen) - 2:59
 "Who's Been Sleeping Here?" (Mikael Kirke, Salen) - 3:00
 "Here Comes Trouble" (Frenzy) - 2:12
 "She's Dead" (Frenzy, Salen) - 2:39
 "Phone Booth Man" (DeSalvo, Salen) - 3:37
 "(Your Love Is Like) Nuclear Waste" (DeSalvo, Salen) - 2:57
 "My Guitar Lies Bleeding in My Arms" (DeSalvo, Morelli) - 3:17
 "Love and Trouble" (Salen) - 3:46
 "Head Over Heels" (Jeff Salen) - 2:44
 "Slash" (DeSalvo) - 3:31
 "Fun City" (DeSalvo) - 2:57
 "All for the Love of Rock N'Roll" (Butani, Salen) - 3:18

Personnel
Tommy Frenzy - Vocals
Jeff Salen - Lead Guitar
Bobby Butani - Guitars
John DeSalvo - Bass
John Morelli - Drums

Source: Tuff Darts "Tuff Darts!" album cover

Reception
Robert Christgau gave the record a C grade, stating: "Maybe Robert Gordon left this band to escape resident sickie John DeSalvo, one of those guys who sounds like he deserves to get fixed by the knife-wielding lesbians he has nightmares about. The only way to make their record more depressing would be to add a hologram of Gordon's replacement, Tommy Frenzy, whose slick blond hair and metal teeth now set the band's android-delinquent "image." Then again, you could take away Jeff Salen's guitar."

References

1978 debut albums
Albums with cover art by Mick Rock
Albums produced by Tony Bongiovi
Albums produced by Bob Clearmountain
Sire Records albums